This is a list of airlines which have an Air Operator Certificate issued by the Civil Aviation Authority  of Croatia.

Scheduled airlines

Charter airlines

See also 
 List of defunct airlines of Croatia
 List of airlines of Europe
 List of defunct airlines of Europe
 List of airlines of Yugoslavia

References

 
Airlines
Croatia
Airlines
Croatia